Janus Green B is a basic dye and vital stain used in histology. It is also used to stain mitochondria supravitally, as was introduced by Leonor Michaelis in 1900.

The indicator Janus Green B changes colour according to the amount of oxygen present. When oxygen is present, the indicator oxidizes to a blue colour. In the absence of oxygen, the indicator is reduced and changes to a pink colour.

References

Staining dyes
Azo dyes
Phenazines
Chlorides
Aromatic amines
Anilines
Diethylamino compounds